Brachypeza, commonly known as sage orchids, is a genus of flowering plants from the orchid family, Orchidaceae. Orchids in this genus have short stems with fleshy leaves and arching flowering stems with short-lived flowers. The sepals and petals are similar in size and shape and the labellum is pouch-like and suspended at the base of the flower. Sage orchids occur in tropical areas from Indochina to New Guinea.

Taxonomy and naming
The genus Brachypeza was first formally described in 1972 by Leslie Andrew Garay and the description was published in the Botanical Museum Leaflets of Harvard University.

Species list
The following is a list of Brachypeza species accepted by the World Checklist of Selected Plant Families as at December 2018.
 Brachypeza archytas (Ridl.) Garay - Christmas Island
 Brachypeza cladostachya (Hook.f.) Kocyan & Schuit.
 Brachypeza indusiata (Rchb.f.) Garay  - Borneo, Malaysia, Maluku, Sulawesi, Sumatra, New Guinea 
 Brachypeza koeteiensis (Schltr.) Garay - Borneo
 Brachypeza laotica (Seidenf.) Seidenf. - Laos, Thailand and possibly Vietnam
 Brachypeza minimipes (J.J.Sm.) Garay - Sumatra
 Brachypeza pallida (Blume) Kocyan & Schuit.
 Brachypeza semiteretifolia (H.A.Pedersen) Kocyan & Schuit.
 Brachypeza simondiana (Gagnep.) Kocyan & Schuit.
 Brachypeza stenoglottis (Hook.f.) Garay - Borneo, Malaysia, Maluku, Sulawesi, Sumatra, New Guinea 
 Brachypeza unguiculata (Lindl.) Kocyan & Schuit.
 Brachypeza zamboangensis (Ames) Garay - Borneo, Philippines

See also
 List of Orchidaceae genera

References

 
Vandeae genera
Orchids of Indonesia
Orchids of Malaysia
Orchids of New Guinea
Orchids of the Philippines
Orchids of Thailand
Flora of Christmas Island
Orchids of Borneo
Taxa named by Leslie Andrew Garay